
The Federation of the Emirates of the South ( Ittiḥād ʾImārāt al-Janūb al-ʿArabiyy) was an organization of states within the British Aden Protectorate in what would become South Yemen.  The Federation of six states was inaugurated in the British Colony of Aden on 11 February 1959, and the Federation and Britain signed a “Treaty of Friendship and Protection,” which detailed plans for British financial and military assistance.  It subsequently added nine states and, on 4 April 1962, became known as the Federation of South Arabia.  This was joined by the Aden Colony on 18 January 1963.

Founding states

Subsequent members

Notes

References and further reading 
 Paul Dresch. A History of Modern Yemen. Cambridge, UK: Cambridge University Press, 2000.
 R.J. Gavin. Aden Under British Rule: 1839-1967. London: C. Hurst & Company, 1975.
 Tom Little. South Arabia: Arena of Conflict. London: Pall Mall Press, 1968.

External links

Aden Protectorate
 
Former countries in the Middle East
South Yemen
20th-century establishments in the Aden Protectorate
1959 establishments in Asia
1959 establishments in the British Empire
States and territories established in 1959
States and territories disestablished in 1962
1962 disestablishments in Asia
1962 disestablishments in the British Empire
Former British protectorates